Garry Michael Galley (born April 16, 1963) is a Canadian broadcaster and former professional ice hockey player. Galley played in the National Hockey League from 1984 to 2001.  Galley was a former co-host of the defunct "More On Sports" radio program on The Team 1200 (now TSN Radio 1200) in Ottawa, Ontario, and is a colour commentator on Hockey Night in Canada.

Galley was born in Greenfield Park, Quebec.

Playing career
Galley played at Bowling Green (CCHA) from 81–82 to 83–84 and was named to the CCHA first all-star team and NCAA All-American in 1984. Galley was drafted 100th overall (5th round) by the Los Angeles Kings in the 1983 NHL Entry Draft. He played in 1,149 career NHL games, scoring 125 goals and 474 assists for 599 points. He also registered 1,218 career penalty minutes. His best offensive season was the 1993–94 season, when he registered 60 assists and 70 points, both career highs.

Galley played two and a half seasons (84–85 to 86–87) with the Los Angeles Kings before being traded to the Washington Capitals in February 1987. He played the rest of the 1986–87 season and competed in the 87–88 season with the Capitals. In July 1988, he signed as a free agent with the Boston Bruins, where he played from 1988–89 to 1991–92. In Game Two of the 1990 playoff series against Montreal, Galley scored the game-winner in overtime. The goal, at the time, was compared to Bobby Orr's famous Cup-clinching goal in 1970. Galley played in the 1991 All-Star Game.

Boston traded Galley to the Philadelphia Flyers in January 1992, and he stayed with the Flyers through to the 1994–95 season, when he was traded to the Buffalo Sabres in April 1995. He played in the 1994 All-Star Game. He played with Buffalo from the end of the 1994–95 season to the 1996–97 season. He then returned to the Kings in July 1997 as a free agent. He played another 3 years with the Kings from 1997–98 to 1999–2000. He played one year for the New York Islanders for the 2000–2001 season and then retired. After he retired he moved back to Ottawa, Ontario where he is a radio host at the Team 1200. He and his family spent some time in New Orleans where he donated $50,000.

Transaction history
 Traded to Washington by Los Angeles for Al Jensen, February 14, 1987.
 Signed as a free agent by Boston, July 8, 1988.
 Traded to Philadelphia by Boston with Wes Walz and Boston's third round choice (Milos Holan) in 1993 Entry Draft for Gord Murphy, Brian Dobbin,  Philadelphia's third round choice (Sergei Zholtok) in 1992 Entry Draft and fourth round choice (Charles Paquette) in 1993 Entry Draft, January 2, 1992.
 Traded to Buffalo by Philadelphia for Petr Svoboda, April 7, 1995.
 Signed as a free agent by Los Angeles, July 15, 1997.
 Signed as a free agent by NY Islanders, September 25, 2000.

Post-playing career
Galley has pursued a career in broadcasting. In addition to a radio show on Team 1200, he is also a colour analyst. He was the analyst for Ottawa Senators games on Rogers Sportsnet East until the conclusion of the 09-10 season. He started working on CBC's Hockey Night in Canada in 2008 and re-joined Sportsnet in the 2014–15 season when its parent company, Rogers Media acquired the sole national rights to the NHL in addition to his HNIC role. He was previously teamed with Dave Randorf, Bob Cole, and Paul Romanuk. He currently works with John Bartlett as the network's number two eastern broadcast team, often involving the Montreal Canadiens or Ottawa Senators.

On May 12, 2008, the Nepean Raiders Junior A Hockey Club announced that Garry Galley would be the new head coach for their team beginning in the 2008–09 season. He left the team in December 2009.

Awards and honours

Career statistics

Regular season and playoffs

International

International play
Galley played for Canada at the 1993 World Championship in Munich, where the Canadian squad placed fourth (8-1-2-3-0) under head coach Mike Keenan.  He won silver (losing to the Czech Republic 4-2) in the World Men's Championship (IIHF) in 1996 under head coach Tom Renney.

See also
List of NHL players with 1000 games played

References

External links
 
Profile at hockeydraftcentral.com

1963 births
Living people
Boston Bruins players
Bowling Green Falcons men's ice hockey players
Buffalo Sabres players
Canadian colour commentators
Canadian ice hockey defencemen
Canadian radio sportscasters
Canadian television sportscasters
Ice hockey people from Quebec
Los Angeles Kings draft picks
Los Angeles Kings players
National Hockey League All-Stars
National Hockey League broadcasters
New York Islanders players
Ottawa Senators announcers
Philadelphia Flyers players
Sportspeople from Longueuil
Washington Capitals players
NCAA men's ice hockey national champions
AHCA Division I men's ice hockey All-Americans